1st Avenue, also known as Cumberland Avenue and Thatcher Avenue for parts of its northern segment, is a north-south street in Chicago and its western suburbs.  It marks 8400 West in the Chicago address system, being located ten and one-half miles west of State Street.

Its southern segment begins at an interchange with Interstate 55 (Stevenson Expressway) in Summit.  At this point, it is called 1st Avenue and carries Illinois Route 171. In Lyons village, the road intersects U.S. Route 34 (Ogden Avenue).  In North Riverside, 1st Avenue intersects 22nd Street.  In Maywood, it intersects Roosevelt Road.  1st Avenue then intersects Interstate 290 (Eisenhower Expressway) in Maywood.  While still in Maywood, 1st Avenue intersects Madison Street, crossing from the south side of the metropolitan area to the north side.  Other streets that 1st Avenue intersects in Maywood are Lake Street and Chicago Avenue.  In Melrose Park, 1st Avenue intersects Illinois Route 64 (North Avenue).  In River Grove, the road intersects Fullerton Avenue and Grand Avenue.  Between these two streets, 1st Avenue ends and continues as Thatcher Avenue, which splits to the southeast and continues until Hawthorne Avenue in River Forest.  While still in River Grove, Thatcher Avenue intersects Belmont Avenue.  It is at this point where Thatcher Avenue ends and Cumberland Avenue begins (the designation it will carry for the remainder of its routing).  Next, Cumberland Avenue enters the city of Chicago and intersects the west end of Addison Street.  Then, it intersects Illinois Route 19 (Irving Park Road).  The next road Cumberland Avenue intersects is Montrose Avenue (at which it enters the village of Norridge), followed by Lawrence Avenue, and then Foster Avenue, re-entering Chicago a block past.  Next, the road has an interchange with Interstate 90 (Kennedy Expressway).  At the northernmost portion of the interchange, Cumberland Avenue intersects Illinois Route 72 (Higgins Road).  Illinois Route 171 ends at this point as well.  Further north into Park Ridge, the road intersects Devon Avenue and Touhy Avenue.  The southern segment of Cumberland Avenue ends at Clifton Avenue and Cedar Street in Park Ridge.

Cumberland Avenue resumes at Oakton Street while still in Park Ridge.  Continuing north into Niles, the road intersects U.S. Route 14 (Dempster Street).  Cumberland Avenue continues north until ending at Church Street in Niles.

In the '20s, Chicago annexed the area of 84th Av and under the Brennan street name system (K-L-M-N-O-P) renamed it "Pueblo". When Chicago replaced their street signs in the 1970s, they replaced the "Pueblo" signs with "Cumberland Av".

See also

References

Streets in Chicago